Archibald Douglas, 5th Earl of Douglas (c. 1391 – 26 June 1439) was a Scottish nobleman and general during the Hundred Years' War.

Life

Douglas was the son of Archibald Douglas, 4th Earl of Douglas and Margaret Stewart, eldest daughter of Robert III. He was Earl of Douglas and Wigtown, Lord of Galloway, Lord of Bothwell, Selkirk and Ettrick Forest, Eskdale, Lauderdale, and Annandale in Scotland, and de jure Duke of Touraine, Count of Longueville, and Seigneur of Dun-le-roi in France. In contemporary French sources, he was known as Victon, a phonetic translation of his Earldom of Wigtown.

He fought with the French at Baugé in 1421, and was made count of Longueville in Normandy. He succeeded to his father's Scottish and French titles in 1424, though he never drew on his father's French estates of the Duchy of Touraine. Douglas served as ambassador to England in 1424, during the ransoming of James I.

He also sat on the jury of 21 knights and peers which convicted Murdoch Stewart, Duke of Albany and two of his sons of treason in 1425, leading to the execution of Albany and the virtual annihilation of his family.

Following the murder of King James I of Scotland at Perth in 1437, Douglas was appointed Lieutenant General of Scotland, and held the office of Regent, during the minority of James II until 1439. Douglas died from a fever in Restalrig, Midlothian, and was buried at Douglas.

Marriage and issue
Between 1423 and 1425 he married Lady Eupheme Graham (before 1413–1468), daughter of Patrick Graham, de jure uxoris Earl of Strathearn and Euphemia Stewart, Countess of Strathearn. They had three children.

William Douglas (c.1424–24 November 1440), who briefly succeeded as 6th Earl
Margaret Douglas, Fair Lady of Galloway (before 1435–1475)
David Douglas (before 1430–24 November 1440)

Both sons were summarily beheaded at Edinburgh Castle on trumped up charges, in the presence of the child King James II. The so-called 'Black Dinner' thus broke the power of the 'Black' Douglases. The lordships of Annandale and Bothwell were annexed by the crown, Galloway to Margaret Douglas, and the Douglas lands and earldom passed to William's great-uncle James Douglas, Earl of Avondale, who was himself implicated, with Sir William Crichton, in the murder of the young earl.

References

Notes

Sources
The Scots Peerage, Balfour Paul, Sir James, Edinburgh 1904
A History of the House of Douglas, Maxwell, Sir Herbert. London 1902

thepeerage.com

14th-century births
1439 deaths
Counts of Longueville
Dukes of Touraine
Earls of Douglas
Archibald Douglas, 5th Earl of Douglas
Lords of Galloway
People of the Hundred Years' War